William Basinski (born June 25, 1958) is an American avant-garde composer based in Los Angeles, California. He is also a clarinetist, saxophonist, sound artist, and video artist.

Basinski is best known for his four-volume album The Disintegration Loops (2002–2003), constructed from rapidly decaying twenty-year-old tapes of his earlier music.

Biography

Early life 
William James Basinski was born in 1958 in Houston, Texas.
He was raised in a Catholic family, and states that he had his first "really mystical, wonderful, magical" musical experiences as an infant at Houston's St. Anne Church. His father was a scientist contracted to NASA, which caused the family to move often. Basinski says he knew that he was gay from an early age.

A classically trained clarinetist, Basinski studied jazz saxophone and composition at the University of North Texas in the late 1970s. In 1978, inspired by minimalists such as Steve Reich and Brian Eno, he began developing his own vocabulary using tape loops and old reel-to-reel tape decks. He developed his meditative, melancholy style experimenting with short looped melodies played against themselves creating feedback loops.

Career 
His first release was Shortwavemusic.  Although created in 1983, it was first released on vinyl in a small edition in 1998 by Carsten Nicolai's Raster-Noton sub-label. This was followed by Watermusic, self-released in 2000 on Basinski's 2062 Records. Another 2-disc work was Variations: A Movement in Chrome Primitive, 1980: it was finally released in 2004 by David Tibet on the Durtro/Die Stadt label. At the time this work was created, Basinski was experimenting with compositions for piano and tape loops.

Throughout the 1980s, Basinski created a vast archive of experimental works using tape loop and delay systems, found sounds, and shortwave radio static. He was a member of many bands including Gretchen Langheld Ensemble and House Afire. In 1989, he opened his own performance space, "Arcadia" at 118 N. 11th Street. On one occasion, he opened for David Bowie, playing saxophone with rockabilly band The Rockats. Basinski would later dedicate a track from A Shadow in Time to Bowie.

In August and September 2001, he set to work on what would become his most recognizable piece, the four-volume album The Disintegration Loops. The recordings were based on old tape loops which had degraded in quality. While attempting to salvage the recordings in a digital format, the tapes slowly crumbled and left a timestamp history of their demise.

Discography

Studio albums 
 Shortwavemusic (1998, Raster-Noton)
 Watermusic (2000, 2062)
 The Disintegration Loops (2002, 2062)
 The River (2002, Raster-Noton)
 The Disintegration Loops II (2003, 2062)
 Watermusic II  (2003, 2062)
 Melancholia (2003, 2062)
 The Disintegration Loops III  (2003, 2062)
 A Red Score in Tile (2003, Three Poplars)
 The Disintegration Loops IV (2003, 2062)
 Variations: A Movement in Chrome Primitive (2004, Durtro/Die Stadt)
 Untitled (2004, Spekk) 
 Silent Night  (2004, 2062)
 The Garden of Brokenness (2006, 2062)
 Variations for Piano and Tape (2006, 2062)
 El Camino Real (2007, 2062)
 92982 (2009, 2062)
 Vivian & Ondine (2009, 2062)
 Aurora Liminalis (2013, Line) 
 Nocturnes (2013, 2062)
 Cascade (2015, 2062)
 The Deluge (2015, 2062)
 Divertissement (2015, Important Records) 
 A Shadow in Time (2017, 2062)
 Selva Oscura (2018, Temporary Residence Limited) 
 On Time Out of Time (2019, Temporary Residence Limited)
Hymns of Oblivion (2020, self-released)
 Lamentations (2020, Temporary Residence Limited)
 " . . . on reflection " (2022, Temporary Residence Limited)

Compilation albums 
 The Disintegration Loops (2012, Temporary Residence Limited)

Film scores
Pursuit of Loneliness (2012)

See also 
List of ambient music artists

References

External links 
 
 
 

1958 births
Ambient musicians
Living people
American male composers
American LGBT musicians
21st-century American composers
Gay composers
University of North Texas College of Music alumni
Musicians from Houston
21st-century American male musicians
Temporary Residence Limited artists